Abderrafi Jouahri (born 1943 in Fes) is a well-known Moroccan columnist, songwriter and politician. As a journalist, he is known as the author of Nafida (meaning window), his weekly column on the back page of Al Ittihad Al Ichtiraki published under the title Leur Excellence.

As poet he is known as the author of the songs he composed with Abdessalem Amer, such as "Rahila," sung by Mohammed al-Hayani, "Al Qamar al Ahmar," sung by Abdelhadi Kalkhayat and "Ya Jar Wadina" by Radjae Belamlih.

In 1996 he became the president of the Union of Moroccan Writers. In 2002 he was elected as a member of parliament of Morocco for the USFP (Union socialiste des forces populaires).

References

Moroccan writers
Moroccan songwriters
1943 births
Moroccan male journalists
Moroccan columnists
Living people
Members of the House of Representatives (Morocco)
Socialist Union of Popular Forces politicians
People from Fez, Morocco